The flame-fronted barbet (Psilopogon armillaris) is an Asian barbet native to Java and Bali. It has a green plumage, a yellow-orange forehead, a blue nape, and an orange crescent on the chest.
Its natural habitats are subtropical or tropical moist lowland forest and subtropical or tropical moist montane forest.

References

External links 
https://www.hbw.com/species/flame-fronted-barbet-psilopogon-armillaris

flame-fronted barbet
Birds of Java
Birds of Bali
flame-fronted barbet
Taxonomy articles created by Polbot